Isse Kehte Hai Golmaal Ghar is an Indian television series that aired on Sahara One channel in 2004. The series premiered on 30 October 2004 starring Gauri Pradhan Tejwani, Manav Gohil, Shagufta Ali, Lovleen Mishra, Ashok Lokhande and Ashiesh Roy. Written and Directed by Sridhar Rangayan. The series ended in 2005.

Cast
 Manav Gohil
 Gauri Pradhan Tejwani
 Shagufta Ali
 Ashok Lokhande
 Ashiesh Roy
 Loveleen Mishra

References

2004 Indian television series debuts
Sahara One original programming
Indian television soap operas
2005 Indian television series endings